The PBR World Cup was a team competition developed by the Professional Bull Riders (PBR) organization in 2007 in which bull riders from 5 countries competed for their share of a $100,000 prize. Each team consisted of 5 riders from their respective countries, each with their own team captain (who was either a current or a former rider).

The twenty-five riders competed in four rounds, two rounds each night, with all the contestants riding in each round, which meant fans could see 50 rides per night. The team captain could only select three scores for each round. Once all four rounds were complete, the team with the highest total score would be declared the winner.

During the first World Cup, the contestants rode with their regular attire that they normally competed in, but starting with the following World Cup, the teams rode with uniforms that represented their respective countries.   

The first World Cup, held in 2007, took place at the Gold Coast Convention and Exhibition Centre in Gold Coast, Queensland, Australia.

The second World Cup was held in 2008 at the Manuel Bernardo Aguirre Gymnasium in Chihuahua, Chihuahua, Mexico.

The third World Cup was held in 2009 at the Parque do Peão in Barretos, São Paulo, Brazil.

The fourth World Cup took place in the spring of 2010 at the Thomas & Mack Center in Las Vegas, Nevada, United States.

The PBR World Cup event has since been discontinued and a new event, the PBR Global Cup, began in 2017.

Results

Medal table

Source:

Participation details

Sources:

See also
PBR Global Cup

References

Rodeo competition series
Organizations based in Colorado
Sports in Colorado
World cups
Professional Bull Riders
Recurring sporting events established in 2007
Recurring sporting events disestablished in 2010